Dirty Hits is a greatest hits album by Scottish rock band Primal Scream. It was released on 3 November 2003 by Columbia Records. The album is generally made up of chronologically listed singles, except the album tracks "Long Life", "Shoot Speed/Kill Light", and "Deep Hit of Morning Sun". The rare C86 single "Velocity Girl" is not included, neither is anything from Sonic Flower Groove or their self-titled 1989 album. Tracks from this period appeared on the compilation's sequel; Shoot Speed – More Dirty Hits, released five months later.

Early limited versions came in a card sleeve with a bonus disc of remixes; most had previously appeared as B-sides.

Track listing

References

External links

Dirty Hits at YouTube (streamed copy where licensed)

Primal Scream albums
2003 compilation albums